The sand goanna (Varanus gouldii) is a species of large Australian monitor lizard, also known as Gould's monitor, sand monitor, or racehorse goanna.

Taxonomy
John Edward Gray described the species in 1838 as Hydrosaurus gouldii, noting the source of the type specimen as "New Holland" and distinguishing the new varanid by "two yellow streaks on the sides of the neck" and small flat scales at the orbits. An earlier description, Tupinambis endrachtensis Péron, F. 1807, was determined as likely to refer to this animal, but the epithet gouldii was conserved and a new specimen designated as the type. 
This neotype was obtained in 1997 at the near coastal Western Australian suburb of Karrakatta, and placed with the British Museum of Natural History. The decision of a nomenclatural commission (ICZN) was to issue an opinion suppressing the earlier names, Tupinambis endrachtensis and Hydrosaurus ocellarius Blyth, 1868, that were unsatisfactory to some who had commented on the case, but provided taxonomic certainty for future revisions of the associated taxa.

The specific name is assumed to be a Latinised form of an associate of the describing author, the ornithologist John Gould, who was actively assembling specimens of fauna from Australia but is not thought to have any direct connection to this species.

In some Aboriginal languages, the sand goanna is called bungarra, a term also commonly used by non-Aboriginal people in Western Australia. In Pitjantjatjara and other central Australian languages it is called "Tingka".

Two subspecies are recognised,
Varanus gouldii gouldii  – Gould's goanna
Varanus gouldii flavirufus  – desert sand monitor

Nota bene: A trinomial authority in parentheses indicates that the subspecies was originally described in a genus other than Varanus.

Description

A species of Varanus, lizards known as monitors and goannas, that is found in a variety of habitat. Due to the taxonomic uncertainty during the twentieth century the species form and behaviour has included taxa later recognised as distinct species, this includes V. rosenbergi, formerly treated as a subspecies and later elevated, and V. panoptes, described as a new species in 1980 and resolved as a legitimate publication in 2000.

Biology
Gould's monitor is a terrestrial reptile that excavates large burrows for shelter. Rock escarpments and tree hollows are also suitable dwellings. It can be found in northern and eastern Australia, where they inhabit open woodlands and grasslands. V. g. flavirufus, a slightly smaller subspecies, resides in Australia's interior. In some places, however, the ranges of Gould's monitor, V. g. flavirufus and the Argus monitor overlap. The similarities between the species and their close proximity frequently cause confusion.

The sand monitor is a relentless forager. It is diurnal, meaning most of its activities take place during the day. Anything smaller than itself will be eagerly devoured. The diets of hatchlings and juveniles often consist mostly of insects and small lizards, but generally varies more with age. Adult monitors will prey on mice, other small mammals, small birds, crustaceans, large insects, small lizard species, snakes, amphibians, eggs, and carrion. They are seemingly immune to snake venom and will kill and eat even the most venomous species such as the inland taipan. The sand goanna does consume smaller species of monitors: Ackies, rock monitors and other dwarf species are often found and eaten. It is common to see a Gould's monitor disturbing rock piles in an attempt to flush out any Odatria. It lays its eggs in termite mounds to protect them from the harsh desert climate.

Like all goannas and snakes the sand monitor has a forked tongue, with which it "tastes" the air. Scents are picked up on each side of the fork which, when retracted, brushes over an area in the mouth called the Jacobson's organ, which identifies on which side the scent is stronger. Upon identifying this difference in scent strength the sand monitor can alter its direction accordingly. A 2021 study had shown that during the Miocene, Komodo dragons had hybridized with the ancestors of the sand goanna, thus providing evidence that the Komodo dragon had once inhabited Australia.

Gallery

Citations

General sources

External links 

 Photo of Varanus gouldii at AROD.com.au
 Photo of Varanus gouldii at Pbase.com

Varanus
Reptiles described in 1838
Taxa named by John Edward Gray
Goanna, sand
Reptiles of Queensland
Reptiles of New South Wales
Monitor lizards of Australia